Corby Castle is an ancestral home of the Howard family situated on the southern edge of the village of Great Corby in northern Cumbria, England.

History
It was originally built in the 13th century, as a red sandstone tower house by the Salkeld Family, who also owned the nearby Salkeld Hall of similar age. It was sold in 1611 to Lord William Howard (1563–1640), the third son of Thomas Howard, 4th Duke of Norfolk, who added a two-storied L-shaped house onto the peel tower.

Corby Castle has an early-18th century landscape garden.

Henry Howard (1757–1842) inherited the estate from Sir Francis Howard, Lord William Howard's second son. The present façade was built for Henry by Peter Nicholson between April 1812 and September 1817.

Robert Martin and Ian Yeates started a glassworks in the grounds of Corby Castle in 1986. They made a range of glass ornaments such as paperweights, perfume bottles and vases. Their work is signed "Martin Yeates".

Present ownership
Corby Castle was sold by Sir John Howard-Lawson Bt. and Lady Howard-Lawson in 1994 to  Irish businessman Edward Haughey. The principal contents of the Castle were sold in 1994 through Phillips of Scotland. Dr Edward Haughey, Baron Ballyedmond (a life peer, represented the Ulster Unionist party in the House of Lords) and carried out a total refurbishment of Corby Castle, and used it for both family and corporate entertainment.

Corby Bridge, a  Grade I listed railway viaduct of 1834, is nearby.

In popular culture
In late 1981 Corby Castle was used as one of the main locations for the shooting of a five-part BBC mini-series. The dramatisation of Wilkie Collins' The Woman in White starred Diana Quick as Marian Halcombe.

See also

Grade I listed buildings in Cumbria
Listed buildings in Wetheral

References

Houses completed in the 13th century
Towers completed in the 13th century
Castles in Cumbria
Country houses in Cumbria
Grade I listed buildings in Cumbria
Peel towers in Cumbria
+
Grade I listed parks and gardens in Cumbria
Wetheral